The 2012 FIBA Asia Under-18 Championship is the 2012 edition of the FIBA Asia's youth championship for basketball. The games were held at Ulan Bator, Mongolia between 17 August and 26 August 2012.
China defeated Korea in the championship to clinch their tenth title. The two finalists, together with third-place Iran, were qualified for the 2013 FIBA Under-19 World Championship.

Qualification

According to the FIBA Asia rules, each zone had two places, and the hosts (Mongolia) and holders (China) were automatically qualified. The other four places are allocated to the zones according to performance in the 2010 FIBA Asia Under-18 Championship.

Draw
The draw was held at the Sports Committee Central Office of the Mongolian Olympic Association on Friday July 27.

Preliminary round

Group A

Group B

Group C

Group D

Second round
 The results and the points of the matches between the same teams that were already played during the preliminary round shall be taken into account for the second round.

Group E

Group F

Classification 13th–16th

Semifinals

15th place

13th place

Classification 9th–12th

Semifinals

11th place

9th place

Final round

Quarterfinals

Semifinals 5th–8th

Semifinals

7th place

5th place

3rd place

Final

Final standing

Awards

All-Star Team:

 PG –  Luo Hanchen
 SG –  Choi Jun-Yong
 SF –  Vahid Dalirzahan
 PF –  Wang Zhelin
 C –  Lee Jong-Hyun

References

External links
Official website
Fiba Asia

 
FIBA Asia Under-18 Championship
2012–13 in Asian basketball
2012 in Mongolian sport
International sports competitions hosted by Mongolia
August 2012 sports events in Asia